The Weeping Myall Woodlands is an endangered ecological community, under the EPBC Act of the Commonwealth of Australia.  It is found in inland Queensland and inland New South Wales, on alluvial plains west of the Great Dividing Range. It takes its name from Acacia pendula, the weeping myall.

The Weeping Myall woodlands ecological community in New South Wales has been named as the Myall Woodland in the Darling Riverine Plains, Brigalow Belt South, Cobar Peneplain, Murray-Darling Depression, Riverina and NSW South Western Slopes bioregions.

Conservation status 
This ecological community has been listed as endangered under the Commonwealth EPBC Act since 7 January 2009. The key threats are clearing and ongoing degradation since this ecological community occurs on highly fertile and arable soils. Other threats are overgrazing and weed invasion.

In New South Wales it is also listed as an endangered ecological community, first under the  NSW Threatened Species Conservation Act 1995 and now under the Biodiversity Act of 2016.

Distribution 
It occurs in the IBRA regions of Riverina, NSW South Western Slopes, Darling Riverine Plains, Brigalow Belt South, Brigalow Belt North, Murray-Darling Depression, Nandewar and Cobar Peneplain, in small pockets.

Species listed

Cases in NSW involving Weeping Myall Woodlands

 Plath v Hunter Valley Property Management Pty Limited - NSW Caselaw (concerned the destruction of a Weeping Myall community in the Hunter Valley)
Chief Executive, Office of Environment and Heritage v Traikaero Pty Ltd; Chief Executive, Office of Environment and Heritage v Woods - NSW Caselaw

References

Endangered ecological communities